Marie Walpurgis, Gräfin von Lerchenfeld, also known as Countess of Lerchenfeld or Madame de Lerchenfeld, (1713–1769) served Empress Maria Theresia in Vienna as the governess of several of her children.  Marie Antoinette, future queen of France, was among her charges.

Early life 
Countess Maria Walpurgis Posthuma von Trauttmansdorff-Weinsberg was born on 13 September 1713 as the youngest posthumous daughter of Count Johann Joseph von Trauttmansdorff-Weinsberg (1676-1713) and Countess Maria Theresia Paar zu Hardtberg (1683-1766). She was paternal aunt of Prince Ferdinand von Trauttmansdorff-Weinsberg.

Marriage and issue 
On 27 July 1735 she was married in Prague to Count Philipp Ernst von und zu Lerchenfeld auf Köfering und Schönberg (1689-1746). They had one son:
 Philipp Nerius Ernst Sigmund Johann Nepomuk, Count von und zu Lerchenfeld auf Köfering und Schönberg (1736-1801) ⚭ Countess Maria Theresia Friederike von Nesselrode zu Ehreshoven (1744-1819); had issue

In books 
She appears in the book Marie Antoinette: Princess of Versailles from The Royal Diaries. In the book, she is a wonderful dancer and a kind woman, whom Marie Antoinette affectionately calls "Lulu".

1769 deaths
Austrian countesses
Year of birth unknown
Governesses to Austrian royalty